The National Historic Monuments of Argentina are buildings, sites and features in Argentina listed by national decree as historic sites. This designation encourages greater protection under the oversight of the Comisión Nacional de Museos, Monumentos y Lugares Históricos (National Commission of Museums, Monuments and Historic Places), created in 1940. In addition, provinces also have local lists of historic monuments.

There are approximately 400 buildings or  sites on the list. Most are buildings or sites from the pre-Hispanic or Colonial periods and some are battlefields and other locations associated with the independence of the country. In recent years the government has been making efforts to include sites on the list that reflect the country's industrial and immigrant heritage.

The Commission has been criticized for not doing enough to preserve the buildings on the list, and only declaring sites as monuments after they have been altered or partly demolished.

City of Buenos Aires
Café Tortoni (1858/98)
Casa Rosada (Government House) (1884/98)
Buenos Aires Botanical Garden (1898)
Buenos Aires Cabildo (17th century)
Buenos Aires Metropolitan Cathedral (18th & 19th century)
The 'May Pyramid' monument in the Plaza de Mayo (1811)
Obelisk of Buenos Aires (1936)
Congressional Palace of Argentina (1906)
Enclosure of the old National Congress (1864)
Teatro Colón (1908)
Our Lady of the Rosary Basilica and Santo Domingo Convent (late 18th century)
House of Bartolomé Mitre (18th century)
House of Domingo Sarmiento (1860)
House of Esteban de Luca (1786)
Buenos Aires Central Post Office (1928)
Estación Retiro (1997)
San Roque Chapel (late 18th century)
San Miguel Church (1788)
San Juan Church (1797)
San Pedro Telmo Church (1734)
San Ignacio Church, Manzana de las Luces (1722)
Former Jesuit buildings, Manzana de las Luces (1730/1780)
Galerías Pacífico
Penitenciaría Nacional (Buenos Aires), in former monastic hospital and women's prison
San Francisco Basilica (1754)

Barolo Palace (1923)
San Martín Palace (1909)
Montserrat Church (1865)
Former Convent of the Mercedarios (first half 18th century)
Basilica of Our Lady of Mercy (1779)
Casa de la Cultura (before 1993 this building housed La Prensa newspaper since its construction in 1898)
Confitería El Molino (1917)
Pizzurno Palace (1888)
Kavanagh Building (1935)
Argentine National Justice Palace (1905–42)
Avellaneda Bridge
Hotel de Inmigrantes (Museum of Immigration) (1906)
ARA Presidente Sarmiento (1872)
Corbeta Uruguay (1874)
Flagship branch the Banco de la Nación Argentina (1938–52)
Cervantes Theater (1921)
José Tiburcio Borda Municipal Hospital (1863/1949)
Seat of the Federación de Asociaciones Católicas de Empleadas (FACE), Calle Sarmiento
Federal firing range, Avenida del Libertador
National Music Centre (former National Library)
Palais de Glace (1911)
Museum of the Garment Industry
Barracks, buildings and gardens of the General San Martín Regiment of Mounted Grenadiers, Palermo
Property known as Los Altos de Elorriaga at Defensa and Alsina, and the house of María Josefa Ezcurra de Ezcurra on Alsina
Exhibition Area of La Sociedad Rural (1878)
Naval Observatory of Argentina, Avenida España (1947)
Embassy of the United Kingdom
Flagship branch of the Banco Hipotecario (1966)
Naval Station of Buenos Aires, Buenos Aires Port
Club de Pescadores (Fishing Club and Pier, 1937)
Argentine Yacht Club (1911)
Headquarters of the Secular Franciscan Order
Our Lady of Balvanera
San José School, at Mitre and Perón
National Historical Museum (former home of Gregorio Lezama, inside 'Lezama Park)
Buenos Aires Customs (1910)
Buenos Aires Metro stations: on Line A - Plaza de Mayo, Perú, Piedras, Lima, Sáenz Peña, Congreso, Pasco-Alberti and Plaza de Miserere; Line C  - San Juan, Independencia, Moreno, Avenida de Mayo, Diagonal Norte, Lavalle and San Martín; Line D  - Catedral, 9 de Julio, Tribunales, Facultad de Medicina, Agüero, Bulnes, Scalabrini Ortiz, Plaza Italia, Palermo; Line E  - San José, Entre Ríos, Pichincha, Jujuy, Urquiza and Boedo
President Roque Sáenz Peña Teaching School, Avda. Córdoba
Buenos Aires Zoo (1875)

Buenos Aires Province

Avellaneda Bridge (see also Buenos Aires city)
Ariston Club, Mar del Plata
Former building of the Banco de la Provincia de Buenos Aires, Bahía Blanca
Municipal Palace, Bahía Blanca
Hotel de Inmigrantes, Bahía Blanca
Post and Telegraph building, Bahía Blanca
Tower of old fort, Carmen de Patagones
Church of Our Lady of Carmen, and tomb of Luis Piedrabuena, Carmen de Patagones
House of Bernardo Bartuille (now municipal house of culture), Carmen de Patagones
'La Carlota' House, Carmen de Patagones
House of the Rial family, known as Mitre House of Rial Ranch, Carmen de Patagones
Historic house of the Banco de la Provincia de Buenos Aires, Carmen de Patagones
House of Andrés García, Carmen de Patagones
House of Cardinal Juan Cagliero, Carmen de Patagones
House of Diego Casero, Ciudad Jardin Lomas del Palomar
Palomar de Casero, Ciudad Jardin Lomas del Palomar
Mariani-Teruggi House, La Plata
House of Ricardo Balbín, La Plata
Museum of Natural Sciences of La Plata
Curutchet House, La Plata
Church of Our Lady of Carmen, Lobos
Municipal Palace, Lobos
Social club (formerly seat of Sociedad Orfeon Lobense), Lobos
Cathedral (Basilica Our Lady of Peace) and Parish house, Lomas de Zamora
Municipal House, Lomas de Zamorra
School No. 1 'Bartolome Mitre', Lomas de Zamorra
Basilica of Our Lady of Luján
Enrique Unzue Saturnine Institute, Mar del Plata
Our Lady of Pilar church, Pilar
House of Juan Manuel de Rosas, San Andrés
Old Bridge, San Antonio de Areco
Parque Criollo and Ricardo Güiraldes Gaucho Museum, San Antonio de Areco
Pulpería 'La Blanqueada', San Antonio de Areco
Church of San Antonio de Padua, San Antonio de Areco
House of the municipal mayoralty, San Antonio de Areco
Estancia 'La Porteña', San Antonio de Areco
Quinta Pueyrredón, San Isidro
Villa Ocampo, San Isidro (1890)
Church of the Holy Sacrament, Tandil
House of Domingo Sarmiento, Tigre
Tigre Club

Catamarca Province
Basílica Nuestra Señora del Valle, San Fernando del Valle de Catamarca
Church at Hualfín
Church of the Lord of Miracles, La Tercena
San José church, Piedra Blanca
Birthplace of Friar Mamerto Esquiú, Piedra Blanca
Chapel of Our Lady of the Rosary nr San José (1715)
Church of San Pedro, Fiambalá (1770)
Ruins of religious buildings, Icaño
Remains of Pucara de Aconquija, Ambato Department
Inca settlement at El Shincal de Quimivil, Belén Department
Pre-Hispanic settlement of Watungasta, Tinogasta Department

Chaco Province
Former government house (Carlos Chiesanova Police Museum), Resistencia 
Former Francés Railway Station (Natural History Museum), Resistencia

Chubut Province
La Trochita, Esquel (1922–45)
Remains of Fort San José de la Candelaria, Gulf of San José
National Primary School No. 17 'Vicente Calderón', El Blanco, Cholila

Córdoba Province
Building of the Banco de la Provincia de Córdoba, Córdoba
Provincial legislature, Córdoba
Córdoba Cabildo (17th century)
The building of Jose de Leo Carnedo from the 17th century.

Corrientes Province
Government House, Corrientes
Holy Cross of Miracles Church, Corrientes (1887)
Church of Santa Ana of the Guácara Indians, Santa Ana (1765)
Sanctuary of Santa Lucía
Estación del Este (railway station) museum, Monte Caseros (1875)

Entre Ríos Province
Cathedral of Paraná
Nuestra Señora del Huerto school assembly hall (former seat of Argentine Senate), Paraná
Palacio San José, near Concepción del Uruguay
Former Customs House, Concepción del Uruguay
Biblioteca Popular del Paraná

Formosa Province
Government House, Formosa
House of governor Ignacio Fotheringham (now 'Juan Pablo Douffard' provincial historic museum), Formosa (1887)

Jujuy Province
Cathedral of San Salvador de Jujuy
Government House, San Salvador de Jujuy
Cabildo (now Museum of Police History) of San Salvador de Jujuy
Santa Barbara church, San Salvador de Jujuy
San Francisco Chapel, Tilcara
Santa Rosa Church, Purmamarca
San Francisco Church, Uquía

La Pampa Province
El Castillo House in Parhaha Luro, Toay Department
 El mate gigante en la Avenida Circunvalación en Santa Rosa
 Monumento a JFK en la Ruta Provincial nº 1 en Quemú-Quemú
 Monumento a Domingo y Eva Perón en la Avenida Circunvalación de General Pico

La Rioja Province
The Padercitas, Cochangasta (a small granite temple) (1927)
Temple and Convent of Santo Domingo, La Rioja

Mendoza Province
Basilica of San Francisco, Mendoza (1875/93)
Vaults of Uspallata, Las Heras Department (late 18th Century)
Chapel and Oratory of Alto Salvador, San Martín Department (1852)
Land, historic willow tree and chapel of the Plumerillo (Old Oratory of the Segura), Las Heras (1870)
The Rosario de Las Lagunas Chapel, Lavalle Department (1864)
Nuestra Señora del Rosario Chapel, Barrancas, Mendoza (late 18th Century)
House of former Governor Francisco Civit, Mendoza (1873)
House of Juan de la Cruz Videla, Cruz de Piedra, Maipú Department
National School Agustín Álvarez, Mendoza (1905)
La Virgen de la Carrodilla church, Luján de Cuyo Department (original 1840, rebuilt 1946)
Three Casas del Rey or hovels of Uspallata (refuges for messengers), Las Cuevas Department (1765/70)
Ruins of the Malal Hue Fort (1846) and the Rufino Ortega Historic Mill (1885), Malargüe
Ruins of San Rafael del Diamante Fort, Villa 25 de Mayo, San Rafael Department (1805)
Ruins of the Jesuit church of San Francisco, Mendoza (1716/31)
Water point and stone bridge de los Españoles, Luján de Cuyo (1788–91)
Former Bodega Arizu, Godoy Cruz (1888–1910)
Former Bodega Arizu, Villa Atuel, San Rafael
Panquehua Bodega and vineyards, Las Heras (1827–1918), plus contents
Giol and Gargantini workers' and supervisors' huts, Maipú (1910)
Site of the Estancia de los Molina, General Ortega district, Maipú
Hydraulic mill at Upsallata Estancia, Las Heras
Farm of General San Martín, San Martín Department (1823)
The property of General San Martín and Seat of the public library "General San Martín" (1815/17)
Site of the birthplace of Mercedes San Martín y Escalada, Mendoza (1815/17)
Mill of Miller Tejeda (1815–16)
Ruins of San Carlos Fort, San Carlos Department (1770)
Colonial bridge over the Picheuta River (late 18th Century)
Pedro del Castillo Square, the old Plaza Mayor of Mendoza (1561) and site of the old Cabildo of Mendoza (1561–1861)
Training ground of the Ejército de los Andes, Mendoza (1814/17)
Historic block of Tunuyán (1823)
Site of the Posta de Rodeo del Medio, Fray Luis Beltrán, Maipú (18th Century)
Mountain pass of la Cumbre (1817)
Cristo Redentor de Los Andes, Las Heras

Battlefields
Site of the Battle of Potrerillos, Luján de Cuyo (1817)
Site of the Battle of Rodeo del Medio, Maipú (1841)
Site of the Battles of Santa Rosa (1874)

Tombs
Tomb of General Gerónimo Espejo (1801–89) at the Gral. Espejo Military School
Tomb of Colonel Antonio de Berutti, Ruins of San Francisco (1772–1841)
Tomb of José Vicente Zapata, Mendoza Cemetery (1851–1897)
Tomb of Juan Gualberto Godoy, Mendoza Cemetery (1793–1864)
Tomb of Tomás Godoy Cruz, San Vicente Ferrer church, Godoy Cruz (1791–1852)
Tomb of Tte. General Rufino Ortega, Maipú (1847–1917)

Misiones Province
Government House, Posadas

Neuquén Province

Río Negro Province
Civic complex, San Carlos de Bariloche

Salta Province
Arias Rengel House, Salta
Salta Cathedral, and Pantheon of the Glories of the North with tomb of Martín Güemes
Monument to Martín Güemes, Salta
Cabildo of Salta, housing Historical Museum of the North
San Francisco church, Salta
San Bernardo convent, Salta
House of Hernández City Museum, Salta
Finca La Cruz and house of Martín Güemes
San José church, Cachi
Potrero de Payogasta, Cachi
Pre-Hispanic settlement of Santa Rosa de Tastil, Rosario de Lerma Department

San Juan Province
Birthplace of Domingo Sarmiento, San Juan
Church and Convent of Santo Domingo, San Juan
Temple of San José de Jáchal, San José de Jáchal
Achango Chapel, Las Flores
Mills of Sardiña in Tamberías (1880); Alto o García (1876) in San Isidro;  (1790, 1870); Escobar or Iglesia in Villa Iglesia; Bella Vista in Villa Iglesia

San Luis Province
Our Lady of the Rosary church, Villa de Merlo
House of Domingo Sarmiento, San Francisco del Monte de Oro
Church of San José del Morro

Santa Cruz Province

 Prehistoric rock art/cave site, Cueva de las Manos

Santa Fe Province
 National Flag Memorial, Rosario
Villa Hortensia, Rosario
 Central Post Office (Palacio de Correos), Rosario
 Former Palace of Justice (now housing the Rosario Law School), Rosario
 Normal School No. 2, Rosario
 Santa Fe la Vieja
 Diez de Andino House (now Provincial Historical Museum), Santa Fe
 Brener Synagogue, Moisés Ville

Santiago del Estero Province
Bridge across Río Dulce between Santiago del Estero and La Banda
Cathedral of Santiago del Estero
Home and museum of Andrés Chazarreta, Santiago del Estero
Sanctuary of Our Lord of Miracles of Mailín, nr Lugones

Tierra del Fuego Province, Argentine Antarctica and South Atlantic Islands
Aguirre Bay (Gardiner Caves)
Buen Suceso Bay
Harberton Station, Isla Grande de Tierra del Fuego
Pavilion of the raising of the national flag by the Lasserre Expedition
Capilla Nuestra Señora de la Candelaria Misión Salesiana, Río Grande
Snow Hill Cabin (Colina Nevada) used by Otto Nordenskiöld's Swedish Antarctic Expedition
Former CAP cold storage plant, Río Grande
Cemetery of the Salesian Mission, Río Grande
Monumento Islas Malvinas, Ushuaia
Parish church of Ushuaia
Former Government House of the Territory, current provincial legislature, Ushuaia
Rosas House, Isla Grande de Tierra del Fuego
Año Nuevo lighthouse, Isla Observatorio
Caleta Falsa at the foot of Monte Bilbao

Tucumán Province
House of Tucumán
Tucumán Cathedral
Provincial Historical Museum, Tucumán (former house of the Avellaneda)
Church of San Francisco, Tucumán
House of José Colombres, Tucumán (Museum of Sugar Industry)
Jesuit Estancia of La Banda, Tafí del Valle

National Historic Places
In addition to the National Historic Monuments, a number of places have been designated 'National Historic Places' (Lugares Históricos Nacionales), including:
Plaza Dorrego, San Telmo, Buenos Aires
Plaza de Mayo, Buenos Aires
Avenida de Mayo, Buenos Aires
Plaza de los Dos Congresos, Buenos Aires
House of Carlos Gardel, Abasto, Buenos Aires
House of Dr Bernardo Houssay, Buenos Aires
Carabassa House, Buenos Aires
Buildings of Austria Street, Buenos Aires
Plaza Rodríguez Peña, Buenos Aires
Garden of the Teachers Plaza, Buenos Aires
Plazoleta Petronila Rodrígiez, Buenos Aires
Plaza Rivadavia, Bahía Blanca, Buenos Aires Province
Cerro de la Caballada, Carmen de Patagones, Buenos Aires Province
Site of original fort and Plaza de Armas, Carmen de Patagones, Buenos Aires Province
Site of the birthplace of Luis Pedrabuena, Carmen de Patagones, Buenos Aires Province
Site of the family house of Ambrosio Mitre, Carmen de Patagones, Buenos Aires Province
Site of the family house of Martín Rivadavia, Carmen de Patagones, Buenos Aires Province
Capilla de los negros, Chascomús, Buenos Aires Province
Ciudad Evita, La Matanza Partido, Buenos Aires Province
Calle Nueva York, port of La Plata, Buenos Aires Province
Plaza 1810, Lobos, Buenos Aires Province
Plaza Victorio Grigera, Lomas de Zamora
Childhood home of Juan Perón, Roque Pérez, Buenos Aires Province
Pre-Hispanic settlement of Rincón Chico, Santa María Department, Catamarca Province
Puerto Bermejo, Chaco Province
Ruins of the city of Concepción de Buena Esperanza, Chaco Province
Site of monument to Cacique Casimiro Biguá, Tehuelches Department, Chubut Province
Monolith and site of fort, Junín de los Andes, Neuquén Province
Battlefield of Chimehuín, Neuquén Province
Remains of cave paintings, Las Juntas, Guachipas, Salta Province
San Juan de Salvamento Port, Isla de los Estados, Tierra del Fuego Province
Former base of the Anglican mission, Ushuaia, Tierra del Fuego Province
El Paramo, Paramo Peninsula, Tierra del Fuego Province
9 de Julio Park, Tucumán, Tucumán Province

See also
:Category:World Heritage Sites in Argentina
National Parks of Argentina

References

External links

 Monumentos Históricos, entre la Burocrácia y la falta de fondos by Daniel Birchner, La Opinión, 2005-10-12
Mendoza Province Culture department
Tourist guide to National Historic Monuments

Monuments
Argentina